Félix Auger-Aliassime defeated J. J. Wolf in the final, 6–4, 6–4 to win the singles tennis title at the 2022 Firenze Open. It was his second ATP Tour singles title.

This was the first edition of an ATP Tour event in Florence since 1994.

Seeds
The top four seeds received a bye into the second round.

Draw

Finals

Top half

Bottom half

Qualifying

Seeds

Qualifiers

Lucky Loser
  Zhang Zhizhen

Qualifying draw

First qualifier

Second qualifier

Third qualifier

Fourth qualifier

References

External links
 Main draw
 Qualifying draw

2022 ATP Tour